Alteryx is an American computer software company based in Irvine, California, with a development center in Broomfield, Colorado. The company's products are used for data science and analytics. The software is designed to make advanced analytics accessible to any data worker.

History 
SRC LLC, the predecessor to Alteryx, was founded in 1997 by Dean Stoecker, Olivia Duane Adams and Ned Harding. SRC developed the first online data engine for delivering demographic-based mapping and reporting shortly after being founded. In 1998, SRC released Allocate, a data engine incorporating geographically organized U.S. Census data that allows users to manipulate, analyze and map data. Solocast was developed in 1998, which was software that allowed customers to do customer segmentation analysis.

In 2000, SRC LLC entered into a contract with the U.S. Census Bureau that resulted in a modified version of its Allocate software being included on CD-ROMs of Census Data sold by the Bureau.

In 2006, the software product Alteryx was released, which was a unified spatial and non-spatial data environment for building analytical processes and applications.

In 2010, SRC LLC changed its name to that of its core product, Alteryx.

In 2011, Alteryx raised $6 million in venture funding from the Palo Alto investment arm of SAP AG, SAP Ventures. In 2013, Alteryx raised $12 million from SAP Ventures and Toba Capital. In 2014, the company raised $60 million in Round B funding from Insight Venture Partners, Sapphire Ventures (formerly SAP Ventures) and Toba Capital, and announced plans for a 30% workforce expansion.

In 2015, ICONIQ Capital led an $85 million investment in Alteryx, with Insight Venture Partners and Meritech Capital Partners also participating. Alteryx announced plans to use the new capital to expand internationally, invest in research and development, and increase its sales and marketing efforts.

In 2016, Alteryx was ranked #24 on the Forbes Cloud 100 list.

On March 24, 2017, Alteryx went public in an IPO listed on the NYSE.

In October 2017, it was discovered that Alteryx was subject to a data breach of partially anonymized data records for approximately 120 million U.S. households.

On February 22, 2018, Alteryx was named a leader in Gartner's 2018 Magic Quadrant for Data Science and Machine Learning Platforms.

Products 
As of July 2020, Alteryx offered the following products as part of an analytics platform (ver. 2019.1):
 Alteryx Connect
 Alteryx Designer
 Alteryx Promote 
 Alteryx Server
 Analytics Hub
 Alteryx Intelligence Suite

Alteryx also hosts a cloud-based website known as the Alteryx Analytics Gallery.

Acquisitions 
In January 2017, Alteryx acquired Prague-based software company, Semanta. Alteryx Connect is an outgrowth of the Semanta acquisition.

In June 2017, Alteryx acquired data science startup Yhat to enhance their capabilities for managing and deploying advanced analytic models ultimately resulting in Alteryx Promote. Alteryx paid $10.8 million in cash and equity. Yhat had raised $2.6 million before the acquisition.

In February 2018, Alteryx acquired Alteryx ANZ, a distributor of altered software based in Sydney, Australia

In April 2019, Alteryx acquired ClearStory Data for $19.6 million in cash.

In October 2019, Alteryx acquired Feature Labs, a machine learning startup founded by 2 MIT researchers for $25.2 million in cash with an additional $12.5 million in equity incentive awards. Feature Labs is known for developing Featuretools, an open source library for automated feature engineering with over 350,000 downloads at the time of acquisition. The acquisition added an engineering hub for Alteryx in Boston, Massachusetts. Feature Labs had raised $1.5 million prior to the acquisition.

In January 2022, Alteryx acquired Trifacta for $400million in cash, with the deal closing the following month.

Awards and recognition
Alteryx was recognized by research firm Gartner as a leader in the 2018 Magic Quadrant for Data Science and Machine Learning Platforms. In addition, Alteryx was named the Gold winner in "The Best Business Intelligence and Analytics Software of 2017, as Reviewed by Customers” by Gartner Peer Insights, a comprehensive platform that provides unfiltered, first-hand product and service ratings and reviews by experienced Enterprise Technology Buyers.

Alteryx has also been named one of Deloitte's Technology Fast 500, an 2019 APPEALIE SaaS Award Winner, and a Top 20 AI All-Stars in Technology by KeyBanc Capital Markets.

In 2017, co-founder and CEO Dean Stoecker received the Ernst and Young Entrepreneur of the Year 2017 Award in the Orange County Region, which recognizes entrepreneurs who excel in areas such as innovation, financial performance and personal commitment to their businesses and communities.

Alteryx was also named as one of the Best Places to Work in Orange County three years in a row (2016), 2017, and 2018, ranking within the top ten in the large employer category.

Kevin Rubin was recognized as the CFO of the Year by the Orange County Business Journal, an annual award that recognizes Orange County CFOs who demonstrated superior leadership and corporate stewardship in the preceding fiscal year.

Data breach
During the October 2017 data breach mentioned above, although no names were attached, telephone numbers and physical addresses were among the 248 fields per household involved in the breach. Also included was "consumer demographics, life event, direct response, property, and mortgage information for more than 235 million consumers" according to the company. Alteryx assembled information from Experian and public sources like the U.S. Census Bureau to create their product which sold for 39,000 per license. Alteryx's hosting on Amazon Web Services had been unsecured (its sources had no breach).

References

External links
 Alteryx website
 

Business intelligence companies
Business software
Extract, transform, load tools
Software companies based in California
Companies based in Irvine, California
Software companies established in 1997
2017 initial public offerings
Companies listed on the New York Stock Exchange
Analytics companies
Data analysis software
Software companies of the United States